Phanom Thuan is a district (amphoe) in the eastern part of Kanchanaburi province, western central Thailand.

History
The area of Phanom Thuan was occupied in prehistoric times. At the archaeological site of Ban Don Ta Phet many artifacts were found in a 4th century cemetery, which indicated trade relations with India, Vietnam, and the Philippines.

At the Don Chedi archaeological site an excavation by the Fine Arts Department in 1982 recovered many human skeletons as well as elephant bones and swords. Thus this site might even have been the location of the famous battle of King Naresuan against the Burmese crown-prince, most commonly assigned to the Don Chedi district nearby.

Phanom Thuan district was one of the first three districts of Kanchanaburi Province. It was at first named Nuea ('northern') district as it covered the northern part of the province. When in 1831 King Rama III relocated the center of Kanchanaburi and readjusted its extent, Nuea district was renamed to Ban Thuan, covering the mountainous areas and the northward flowing river. In 1939 the district name was changed to Phanom Thuan.

The name "Phanom Thuan" comes from a local waterway Khlong Thuan or Maenam Thuan, a minor branch of Mae Klong River which separated itself from the Mae Klong at Tha Muang district in the area of Mae Klong Dam then flows upstream (hence the name "Phanom Thuan", which means "upstream water course") up till it finally confluence with Khlong Chorakhe Sam Phan, a branch of Tha Chin River.

Geography
Neighbouring districts are (from the south clockwise) Tha Maka, Tha Muang, Bo Phloi, Huai Krachao of Kanchanaburi Province, U Thong and Song Phi Nong of Suphanburi province.

Administration
The district is divided into eight sub-districts (tambons), which are further subdivided into 103 villages (mubans). There are four sub-district municipalities (thesaban tambon) within the district. Phanom Thuan covers the central part of the sub-district Phanom Tuan, Talat Khet the part central of Rang Wai. The municipality Rang Wai covers the remaining parts of the sub-district, and Nong Sarai the whole of the same-named tambon. There are a further six tambon administrative organizations (TAO).

Missing numbers now form Huai Krachao District.

References

External links

amphoe.com

Phanom Thuan